Street Hero is a 1984 Australian film directed by Michael Pattinson and starring Vince Colosimo, Sigrid Thornton, Sandy Gore, Bill Hunter and Ray Marshall. The film won an AFI award.

Plot
Vinnie is a teenage boy who is an outcast at school, alienating teachers and students alike. He is a local courier for the local Mafia boss. He lives in welfare housing with his mother (Peta Toppano), a young brother and sister, and his Mum's lover who he cannot stand. Vinnie takes out his aggression with the world practicing boxing at the local gym. He is haunted by images of his father (when just a boy he witnessed his father's murder) and his father's boxing career. His music teacher (Sandy Gore) encourages him to get involved as a drummer with the school band, and his girlfriend Gloria (Sigrid Thornton) and others influence him to stay away from the Mafia.

Cast
 Vince Colosimo as Vinnie
 Sigrid Thornton as Gloria
 Sandy Gore as Bonnie Rogers
 Bill Hunter as Detective Fitzpatrick
 Ray Marshall as George
 Amanda Muggleton as Miss Reagan
 Peta Toppano as Vinnie's Mother
 Luciano Catenacci as Ciccio
 Peter Albert Sardi as Joey
 Robert Noble as Mick O'Shea
 Tibor Gyapjas as Freddo
 Vince D'Amico as Nino
 John Lee as Vice Principal
 Fincina Hopgood as Trixie
 John Murphy as Old Harry
 Tony Volpe as Sylvester
 Libbi Gorr as Alexia
 Laurie Dobson as SP Bookmaker
 Shane Feeney-Connor as Yokel's Mate
 Pip Mushin as Yokel's Mate
 Jenny Apps as Yokel's Moll
 George Bidlo as Large Man
 Lois Collinder as Travel Lady
 George Harlem as Pimp
 Tiriel Mora as Junky
 Chris Hargreaves as Policeman
 Graham Brooke as 1st Boxing Opponent

Awards
Street Hero was nominated for seven AFI awards in 1984 including Best Actor (Vince Colosimo), Best Supporting Actress (Sandy Gore), Best Supporting Actress (Peta Toppano), Best Original Screenplay (Jan Sardi), Best Original Music Score (Garth Porter), although it only won Best Achievement in Sound.

Production
Colosimo, Sardi and Pattinson had previously made Moving Out (1982). When making that film Sardi and Pattinson discovered music teachers would help underprivileged children by encouraging them to become involved in music, which inspired this film. Pattinson took the script to Bonnie Harris of Roadshow Entertainment, who got Paul Dainty involved.

The movie was a conscious effort on the part of Pattinson and Sardi to make something more commercial than their first film, while still having something based in reality. The director later admitted that the choice of music used in the film - including Leo Sayer, Sharon O'Neill and Dragon - was "maybe a bit too middle of the road".

Box office
Street Hero took in $729,344 (AUS) at the box office, making it the 203rd most successful Australian Film (1996–2008).

Soundtrack

 "Every Beat of My Heart" (Garth Porter) - Jon English, Renee Geyer - 3:04
 "New Hero" (Ian Morrison, Les Barker) - Dear Enemy - 4:19
 "Blood Red Roses" (Sharon O’Neill) - Sharon O’Neill - 4:58
 "Haunting Me" (Leo Sayer, Vini Poncia) - Leo Sayer - 4:52
 "Billy’s Theme"(Rock instrumental) (Garth Porter) - 2:05
 "Wilderworld" (Todd Hunter, Johanna Pigott, Marc Hunter) - Dragon - 3:55
 "Death Before Dishonour" (Ross Wilson, David Pepperell, James Black) - Ross Wilson, James Black - 4:06
 "No Angels Tonight" (Garth Porter, Clive Shakespeare, Tony Leigh) - Daryl Braithwaite - 3:30
 "Something To Believe In" (Del Shannon, Wendy Matthews) - Del Shannon - 3:11
 "Every Beat of My Heart" (Garth Porter, Red Symons, John Shaw) - The Streethero Orchestra - 3:09

References

External links
Street Hero at IMDb
Street Hero at Oz Movies
Street Hero at Allmovie
Street Hero at Screen Australia
Street Hero at British Film Institute

1984 films
1984 drama films
Australian drama films
Films shot in Australia
Films set in Australia
Films directed by Michael Pattinson
1980s English-language films